Parornix finitimella is a moth of the family Gracillariidae. It is found in nearly all of Europe, except Ireland, the Iberian Peninsula and parts of the Balkan Peninsula.

The wingspan is about 10 mm. Adults are on wing in May and again in August in two generations.

The larvae feed on Prunus armeniaca, Prunus avium, Prunus cerasifera, Prunus domestica, Prunus insititia, Prunus mahaleb, Prunus padus, Prunus persica and Prunus spinosa. They mine the leaves of their host plant. The mine starts as a lower-surface epidermal corridor, widening into a blotch, resulting in a small, strongly inflated, tentiform mine between two side veins. The leaf tissue is eaten away up to the upper epidermis. The lower epidermis is strongly folded. The larvae leaves the mine and continues feeding under a leaf tip or margin that has been folded downwards. A single larva creates at least two of such folds, which are eaten out from the inside.

References

Moths described in 1850
Parornix
Moths of Europe